Grimwood's longclaw (Macronyx grimwoodi) is a species of bird in the family Motacillidae.
It is found in Angola, Democratic Republic of the Congo, and Zambia.
Its natural habitat is subtropical or tropical seasonally wet or flooded lowland grassland.

References

Grimwood's longclaw
Birds of Central Africa
Grimwood's longclaw
Taxa named by Constantine Walter Benson
Taxonomy articles created by Polbot